Milton Ellenby is an American bridge player.

Ellenby is a World Champion, having won the Bermuda Bowl in 1954.

Bridge accomplishments

Awards

 Fishbein Trophy (1) 1953

Wins

 Bermuda Bowl (1) 1954 
 North American Bridge Championships (6)
 Chicago Mixed Board-a-Match (1) 1957 
 Open Pairs (1928-1962) (1) 1955 
 Spingold (2) 1953, 1954 
 Wernher Open Pairs (1) 1951 
 von Zedtwitz Life Master Pairs (1) 1953

Runners-up

 Bermuda Bowl (1) 1955 
 North American Bridge Championships (2)
 Spingold (1) 1957 
 Wernher Open Pairs (1) 1954

Notes

American contract bridge players
Bermuda Bowl players
Living people
Year of birth missing (living people)